Rah Rah was an indie rock musical group formed in 2006 in Regina, Saskatchewan, Canada. They toured extensively across North America and Europe. The band released four full-length albums, including 2015's Vessels. After a three year hiatus, the band played three final live shows in December of 2019 and disbanded.

History
The group formed as a three piece in 2006 made up of Erin Passmore (drums/vocals), Kyrie Kristmanson (trumpet/guitar/vocals) and Marshall Burns (guitar/vocals). In 2006 they released the Songs for Pasquala EP independently. That same year the band performed at the Regina Folk Festival as well as Pop Montreal.

By 2007 Joel Passmore (formerly of Despistado and Sylvie) had joined the band on bass along with Samra Sahlu on keyboards and Kristina Hedlund on violin. The five-piece recorded their debut full length Going Steady which was released in November 2008 on Young Soul Records. Shortly thereafter Leif Thorseth, also formerly of Despistado, joined the band on guitar.

In 2009 the band toured Canada extensively in support of the album. The group also began work on their next record with producer Kees Dekker (Plants and Animals) in Montreal. This second full-length album, Breaking Hearts, was eventually nominated for a Western Canadian Music Award, for Rock Recording of the Year.

In late May 2009 Rah Rah's song "Duet for Emmylou and the Grievous Angel" was available for free download on iTunes for a week. Also, the song "Tentacles" was available in Starbucks stores as the free download card of the week.

The band underwent another line-up change in the fall of 2009 when Vanessa Benson (keyboards/vocals/bass) joined the group. Rah Rah was named "Best Alternative New Artist" and "Best New Canadiana Artist" on iTunes Canada's Best of 2009 list. Rah Rah headlined the Whistler Live! stage during the 2010 Paralympic Games and also performed at the Saskatchewan Pavilion.

In 2012 the group signed with Montreal's Hidden Pony Records. That year the band released their third LP, The Poet's Dead, which marked the debut of Jeffrey Romanyk on drums. The album was produced by Gus Van Go and Werner F. at the Boiler Room Studio. In 2013 the album was longlisted for the 2013 Polaris Music Prize as well as nominated for a Juno Award for Best Alternative Album. It also won the WCMA for Independent Album of the Year.

Also in 2013, the band, now a five piece, signed with German label Devil Duck Records and subsequently toured Europe.

In 2015 the band released their fourth LP, Vessels, again produced by the production team of Gus Van Go and Werner F.

In 2019, after a three year hiatus from recording and touring, the group announced they were disbanding and the members were all moving on to other projects. The band released one final song, "Art Holds No Truth" from the 2015 Vessels sessions, and played three final shows in their home province before the New Year, in Saskatoon and Regina.

The band had toured with such notable acts as Wintersleep, The Besnard Lakes, Land of Talk, Yukon Blonde, Dear Rouge, Plants and Animals, Said the Whale, Two Hours Traffic, Minus the Bear and The Elwins.

They had also performed at a number of festivals such as CMJ in New York City, NXNE and CMW in Toronto, SXSW in Austin, Texas, Reperbahn Festival in Hamburg, Germany, Great Escape in Brighton, England, Halifax Pop Explosion, Pop Montreal, Supercrawl in Hamilton, Ontario, BreakoutWest, JunoFest and Sled Island in Calgary, Alberta.

The group was noted for their energetic live shows which often featured some combination of giant balloons, piñatas, robot cats, Pop Rocks candy, and confetti.

Members 
Marshall Burns – guitar, vocals
Kristina Hedlund – violin, vocals, keyboard
Erin Passmore – vocals, keyboard, guitar, drums
Joel Passmore – bass, vocals
Jeffrey Romanyk – drums, guitar
Leif Thorseth – guitar

Discography

Albums
Going Steady (November 18, 2008)
Breaking Hearts (June 1, 2010)
The Poet's Dead (October 2, 2012)
Vessels (September 11, 2015)

EPs
Songs for Pasquala (2006)
The Sailors (March 22, 2011)

Remix albums
Rahmixes (2011)

Singles

References

External links

Rah Rah at CBC Radio 3

Canadian indie rock groups
Musical groups established in 2005
Musical groups from Regina, Saskatchewan
2005 establishments in Saskatchewan